Béla Háray (March 25, 1915 – March 9, 1988) was a Hungarian ice hockey and field hockey player who competed in the 1936 Winter Olympics and in the 1936 Summer Olympics.

He was born and died in Budapest, Hungary.

In 1936 he was part of the Hungarian ice hockey team which was eliminated in the second round of the Olympic tournament. He played five matches and scored four goals.

At the 1936 Summer Games he was a member of the Hungarian field hockey team which was eliminated in the group stage of the Olympic tournament. He played all three matches as forward and scored two goals.

External links
profile

1915 births
1988 deaths
Ferencvárosi TC (ice hockey) players
Field hockey players at the 1936 Summer Olympics
Hungarian male field hockey players
Ice hockey players at the 1936 Winter Olympics
Olympic field hockey players of Hungary
Olympic ice hockey players of Hungary
Sportspeople from Budapest
20th-century Hungarian people